The flag of Nigeria was designed in 1959 and first officially hoisted on 1 October 1960.
The flag has three vertical bands of green, white, green. The two 
green stripes represent natural wealth, and the white represents peace and unity.

Design 
The flag is an adaptation of the winning entry from Michael Taiwo Akinkunmi in a competition held in 1959. Akinkunmi was a 23-year-old student at the time he designed the flag. He was studying at Norwood Technical College in London, England, when he saw an advertisement in a newspaper that submissions were being accepted for the design of a new national flag of Nigeria. He submitted a triband design consisting of a white vertical band in the centre, with a green vertical band on each side. The design also contained a radiating red sun in the white vertical centre of the flag. He won the contest, however the judges removed the red sun, leaving only a green and white triband design for the national flag. It is typical for culturally diverse countries such as Nigeria to choose simpler and less complex flag designs in order to avoid inadvertently offending particular ethnic or religious groups. The flag has remained unchanged ever since then. It was first officially used on 1 October 1960, the day Nigeria was granted independence from the United Kingdom.

Nigeria has special ensigns for civil and naval vessels. Some of its states also have flags.

Colour specifications

Other flags

State flags and ensigns

Presidential flags

Military flags

Historical flags

Subnational flags

See also 

Coat of arms of Nigeria
Flag of Biafra
Flag of Rhodesia

References

External links

http://www.flagscorner.com/nigeria-flag/
Worldstatesmen.org – Nigeria
Coats of arms and flags of Nigerian states
2022 Nigerian National Sports Festival Opening Ceremony State flags can be seen during the parade of states

Flags adopted through competition
Flags of Africa
Flag
Flags introduced in 1960
Nigeria